The 1971 Atlantic Coast Conference men's basketball tournament was held in Greensboro, North Carolina, at the Greensboro Coliseum from March 11–13. South Carolina defeated North Carolina, 52–51, to win the championship. This was the only ACC Tournament that South Carolina won and the last ACC Tournament in which they played. Lee Dedmon of North Carolina and John Roche of South Carolina tied as tournament MVPs. In the final, 6'3" Kevin Joyce out-jumped 6"10" Dedmon with seconds remaining to tap the ball to Tom Owens, who was left alone under the basket. Owens made the layup to give South Carolina the win as time expired.

Bracket

References

Tournament
ACC men's basketball tournament
Basketball in North Carolina
College sports in North Carolina
Sports competitions in Greensboro, North Carolina
ACC men's basketball tournament
ACC men's basketball tournament